Totnes Reform Jewish Group, a member of the Movement for Reform Judaism, is a Reform Jewish congregation in Totnes, Devon, England. The congregation, which is also known as Totnes Jewish Community, dates from 2001.

See also
 List of Jewish communities in the United Kingdom
 List of former synagogues in the United Kingdom
 Movement for Reform Judaism

References

External links
 Totnes Reform Jewish Group on Jewish Small Communities Network website

2001 establishments in England
Reform synagogues in the United Kingdom
Totnes